Adam Feliks Ronikier (1 November 1881, Warsaw – 4 September 1952, Orchard Lake, Michigan) was a Polish count and conservative politician.

During the World War I, he was a president of the Central Welfare Council (Rada Główna Opiekuńcza) in the period 1916–1918 in Kingdom of Poland, and again during the World War II from June 1940 to October 1943 in General Government. The council received financial supply both from the German authorities and (clandestinely) from the Polish Government in Exile.

In December 1943, he met Horace Coock, British political agent in Warsaw. In February 1944, Ronikier was arrested by Gestapo in Cracow for three weeks. In July 1944, he again discussed with SS-Obersturmbannführer Hans Gerd Schindhelm to save lives of many thousands of Polish young people in Warsaw who were ready to fight against Germans to the death without any chance to win. Count Ronikier had presented an idea to end a German occupation of Warsaw without military combat – Polish Home Army takes Warsaw from German hands. It was supported by some German politicians and field officers (almost like the liberation of Paris in August 1944). Finally, the Warsaw Uprising broke out on 1 August 1944.

He left Poland on 18 January 1945, because of threat of arrest and possible death penalty, just before the Soviet army drove the German forces from Cracow. He died in exile in the United States.

1881 births
1952 deaths
Ambassadors of Poland to Germany
Polish politicians
Polish refugees
Counts of Poland
Polish emigrants to the United States